Robert Rapson (19 November 1951-27 January 2020) was a New Zealand ceramicist.

In 2021 there was a exhibition of his work at the Dowse Art Museum called Against the Tide.

External links
 Interview with Robert Rapson, Standing Room Only, Radio New Zealand, 3 August 2014

References

New Zealand ceramicists
1951 births
2020 deaths